Jean-Yves Thériault is a Canadian kickboxer, kickboxing trainer, and author.

Biography
Jean-Yves Thériault was born in Paquetville, New Brunswick, Canada. He was the fifth of six sons.

Thériault began his martial arts training in 1972 at age 17, achieving blue belt status in Jujutsu before becoming interested in Karate and Full Contact Karate few years later. He won his first Full Contact Karate competition in 1976 after only six months of training under the direction of John Therien (who now holds Hanshi degree in Ju-Jitsu), and subsequently became Canadian middleweight kickboxing champion two and a half years later. In 1980 he won the PKA Middleweight World title (Full-contact karate), and held the championship for a record of 15 years. He has also won world titles in both the ISKA and PKC associations. During the peak of his career, Thériault held only a yellow belt in Karate.

He was referred to as "The Iceman," a nickname given to him by Rodney Batiste during his first title defence, due to his intimidating icy stare and cool demeanour in the ring.  Thériault has a number of high-profile victories, including two wins against future four-time K-1 champion Ernesto Hoost and a draw against the legendary Don "The Dragon" Wilson.  He has also fought world champions such as Rob Kaman, Tosca Petridis and Rick Roufus.

Thériault has worked with many groups and charities, such as the Big Brothers, Make a Wish Foundation - Canada, Leucan. He is author of a book on kickboxing techniques and has a series of videos on the science of combat sports. He is the subject of an hour and a half film produced by the National Film Board. He was voted Athlete of the Decade by the Sports Writers Association of New Brunswick. However, the New Brunswick Sports Hall of Fame still will not induct him into their ranks after several attempts by fans and friends.

Since his retirement on December 1, 1995, (a third-round knockout of Marcus Reid) Thériault still trains five days a week and teaches classes at Therien Ju-Jitsu & Kickboxing Schools.

Thériault has also become a world-class promoter for the sport of kickboxing. With the aid of his friend Hanshi John Therien, he is giving young fighters an opportunity in the "Iceman Amateur Kickboxing Circuit".

Thériault obtained his Black Belt in Ju-Jitsu in early 2008.

Titles
1995 I.S.K.A. Full Contact Light Heavyweight World Champion
1992 I.S.K.A. Full Contact Super Middleweight World Champion
1988 I.S.K.A. Full Contact Light Heavyweight World Champion
I.S.K.A. Full Contact Super Middleweight World Champion
P.K.C. Super Middleweight Full Contact World Champion
1980-1995 P.K.A. Full Contact Middleweight World Champion
1978 Canadian Full Contact Middleweight Kickboxing Champion

Professional kickboxing record
Thériault fought 76 fights from June 1976 to December 1995. Of those fights, 69 were wins (61 knockouts), 6 were losses, and 1 was a draw. The one draw was with Don "The Dragon" Wilson on December 18, 1984. Thériault was full-contact World Champion 23 times.

|-
|-  bgcolor="#CCFFCC"
| 1995-12-01 || Win ||align=left| Marcus Reed || || Verdun, Québec, Canada || TKO || 3 || || 69-6-1
|-
! style=background:white colspan=9 |
|-
|-  bgcolor="#FFBBBB"
| 1994-03-26 || Loss ||align=left| Rick Roufus || Karatemania VIII || Montreal, Québec, Canada || Decision (Unanimous) || 12 ||  || 68-6-1
|-
! style=background:white colspan=9 |
|-
|-  bgcolor="#CCFFCC"
| 1993-11-? || Win ||align=left| Sergei Andrianov || || Montreal, Québec, Canada || KO || 3 || || 68-5-1
|-
|-  bgcolor="#FFBBBB"
| 1993-06-22 || Loss ||align=left| Tosca Petridis || || Verdun, Québec, Canada || Decision (Split) || 12 ||  || 67-5-1
|-
! style=background:white colspan=9 |
|-
|-  bgcolor="#CCFFCC"
| 1992-12-15 || Win ||align=left| Leo De Snoo || || Verdun, Québec, Canada || Disqualification || 11 || || 67-4-1
|-
! style=background:white colspan=9 |
|-
|-  bgcolor="#FFBBBB"
| 1992-06-20 || Loss ||align=left| Rob Kaman || || Paris, France || TKO (Gave Up) || 5 || 2:00 || 66-4-1
|-
! style=background:white colspan=9 |
|-
|-  bgcolor="#CCFFCC"
| 1991-11-23 || Win ||align=left| Kevin Morton || || Marseilles, France || Decision (Unanimous) || 12 ||  || 66-3-1
|-
! style=background:white colspan=9 |
|-
|-  bgcolor="#CCFFCC"
| 1991-10-25 || Win ||align=left| Klaus Nonnemacher || Thriller from Paris II || Paris, France || TKO || 8 || || 65-3-1
|-
|-  bgcolor="#CCFFCC"
| 1991-03-? || Win ||align=left| Michel Mangeot || || Marseilles, France || TKO || 4 || || 64-3-1
|-
! style=background:white colspan=9 |
|-
|-  bgcolor="#CCFFCC"
| 1990-12-17 || Win ||align=left| Yediah Judah || || Verdun, Québec, Canada || TKO || 6 || || 63-3-1
|-
|-  bgcolor="#CCFFCC"
| 1990-12-11 || Win ||align=left| Mark Longo || || Quebec City, Québec, Canada || Decision (Unanimous) || 12 ||  || 62-3-1
|-
|-  bgcolor="#CCFFCC"
| 1990-02-20 || Win ||align=left| Andy Mayo || || Verdun, Québec, Canada || KO || 4 || || 61-3-1
|-
|-  bgcolor="#CCFFCC"
| 1989-12-12 || Win ||align=left| William Knorr || || Verdun, Québec, Canada || KO || 4 || || 60-3-1
|-
|-  bgcolor="#CCFFCC"
| 1989-04-21 || Win ||align=left| Ernesto Hoost || || Geneva, Switzerland || Decision (Split) || 12 ||  || 59-3-1
|-
|-  bgcolor="#CCFFCC"
| 1988-06-03 || Win ||align=left| Bob Thurman || || Le Havre, France || KO || 3 || 1:37 || 58-3-1
|-
! style=background:white colspan=9 |
|-
|-  bgcolor="#CCFFCC"
| 1987-11-? || Win ||align=left| Larry McFadden || || Montreal, Québec, Canada || KO || 2 || || 57-3-1
|-
|-  bgcolor="#CCFFCC"
| 1987-05-? || Win ||align=left| C.L. Bergeron || || Montreal, Québec, Canada || KO || 1 || || 56-3-1
|-
|-  bgcolor="#CCFFCC"
| 1986-12-14 || Win ||align=left| Ernesto Hoost || || Montreal, Québec, Canada || Decision (Unanimous) || 12 ||  || 55-3-1
|-
|-  bgcolor="#CCFFCC"
| 1986-09-? || Win ||align=left| Richard Green || || Montreal, Québec, Canada || KO  || 4 || || 54-3-1
|-
|-  bgcolor="#CCFFCC"
| 1986-04-26 || Win ||align=left| Bob Thurman || Karatemania || Atlanta, Georgia, USA || TKO (Doctor Stoppage) || 4 || || 53-3-1
|-
! style=background:white colspan=9 |
|-
|-  bgcolor="#CCFFCC"
| 1986-02-? || Win ||align=left| Bob Handegan || || Atlanta, Georgia, USA || KO || 1 || || 52-3-1
|-
|-  bgcolor="#CCFFCC"
| 1985-10-12 || Win ||align=left| Paul Madison || || Denver, Colorado, USA || KO || 5 || || 51-3-1
|-
|-  bgcolor="#CCFFCC"
| 1985-07-? || Win ||align=left| C.L. Bergeron || || Moncton, New Brunswick, Canada || KO || 4 || || 50-3-1
|-
|-  bgcolor="#CCFFCC"
| 1985-05-01 || Win ||align=left| Andy Brewer || || Hull, Québec, Canada || KO || 1 || || 49-3-1
|-
|-  bgcolor="#CCFFCC"
| 1985-02-? || Win ||align=left| Bret Zwierzynski || || Sainte-Brigide-d'Iberville, Québec, Canada || KO || 2 || || 48-3-1
|-
|-  bgcolor="#c5d2ea"
| 1984-12-18 || Draw ||align=left| Don Wilson || || Verdun, Québec, Canada || Decision Draw || 12 || || 47-3-1
|-
|-  bgcolor="#CCFFCC"
| 1984-10-30 || Win ||align=left| Bob Handigan || || Hull, Québec, Canada || KO || 3 || || 47-3
|-
|-  bgcolor="#CCFFCC"
| 1984-10-? || Win ||align=left| Virgil Myers || || Moncton, New Brunswick, Canada || KO || 1 || || 46-3
|-
|-  bgcolor="#CCFFCC"
| 1984-09-? || Win ||align=left| Gary Cicciolletti || || Montreal, Québec, Canada || KO || 1 || || 45-3
|-
|-  bgcolor="#CCFFCC"
| 1984-06-? || Win ||align=left| Lonnie Grady || || Montreal, Québec, Canada || KO || 4 || || 44-3
|-
|-  bgcolor="#CCFFCC"
| 1984-04-10 || Win ||align=left| Rodney Batiste || || Verdun, Québec, Canada || KO || 7 || || 43-3
|-
|-  bgcolor="#CCFFCC"
| 1984-01-? || Win ||align=left| Paul Ford || || New York City, New York, USA || KO || 6 || || 42-3
|-
|-  bgcolor="#CCFFCC"
| 1983-12-20 || Win ||align=left| Leroy Hopkins || || Verdun, Québec, Canada || TKO || 9 || || 41-3
|-
|-  bgcolor="#CCFFCC"
| 1983-11-? || Win ||align=left| Larry McFadden || || Montreal, Québec, Canada || KO || 3 || || 40-3
|-
|-  bgcolor="#CCFFCC"
| 1983-09-? || Win ||align=left| David James || || Hull, Québec, Canada || KO || 1 || || 39-3
|-
|-  bgcolor="#CCFFCC"
| 1983-09-? || Win ||align=left| Steve Wright || || Quebec City, Québec, Canada || KO || 3 || || 38-3
|-
|-  bgcolor="#CCFFCC"
| 1983-08-23 || Win ||align=left| Wade Woodbury || || Verdun, Québec, Canada || Decision (Split) || ||  || 37-3
|-
|-  bgcolor="#CCFFCC"
| 1983-06-28 || Win ||align=left| Roosevelt Moss || || Verdun, Québec, Canada || KO ||  || || 36-3
|-
|-  bgcolor="#CCFFCC"
| 1983-05-11 || Win ||align=left| Don Setzer || || Verdun, Québec, Canada || KO ||  || || 35-3
|-
|-  bgcolor="#CCFFCC"
| 1983-03-? || Win ||align=left| Junior Bowden || || Montreal, Québec, Canada || KO ||  || || 34-3
|-
|-  bgcolor="#CCFFCC"
| 1983-01-? || Win ||align=left| Steve Mackey || || Toronto, Ontario, Canada || KO ||  || || 33-3
|-
|-  bgcolor="#CCFFCC"
| 1982-11-17 || Win ||align=left| Kerry Roop || || Verdun, Quebec, Canada || TKO ||  || || 32-3
|-
! style=background:white colspan=9 |
|-
|-  bgcolor="#CCFFCC"
| 1982-10-? || Win ||align=left| Bernard Clark || || London, Ontario, Canada || TKO ||  || || 31-3
|-
|-  bgcolor="#CCFFCC"
| 1982-09-? || Win ||align=left| Tommy Richardson || || Ottawa, Ontario, Canada || TKO ||  || || 30-3
|-
|-  bgcolor="#CCFFCC"
| 1982-06-? || Win ||align=left| Maurice Moore || || Montreal, Quebec, Canada || KO ||  || || 29-3
|-
|-  bgcolor="#CCFFCC"
| 1982-04-25 || Win ||align=left| Andy Brewer || || Verdun, Québec, Canada || KO ||  || || 28-3
|-
|-  bgcolor="#CCFFCC"
| 1982-03-? || Win ||align=left| Ron Scott|| || Ottawa, Ontario, Canada || TKO ||  || || 27-3
|-
|-  bgcolor="#CCFFCC"
| 1982-02-? || Win ||align=left| Mark Zacharatos || || Windsor, Ontario, Canada || KO ||  || || 26-3
|-
|-  bgcolor="#CCFFCC"
| 1982-01-26 || Win ||align=left| Jarvis Gardner || || Verdun, Québec, Canada || KO ||  || || 25-3
|-
|-  bgcolor="#CCFFCC"
| 1981-11-17 || Win ||align=left| Eddie Durant || || Ottawa, Ontario, Canada || TKO ||  || || 24-3
|-
|-  bgcolor="#CCFFCC"
| 1981-07-18 || Win ||align=left| Wade Woodbury || || Ottawa, Ontario, Canada || Decision (Split) || ||  || 23-3
|-
! style=background:white colspan=9 |
|-
|-  bgcolor="#CCFFCC"
| 1981-04-25 || Win ||align=left| Rodney Baliste || || Ottawa, Ontario, Canada || KO ||  || || 22-3
|-
|-  bgcolor="#CCFFCC"
| 1980-11-15 || Win ||align=left| Robert Biggs || || Ottawa, Ontario, Canada || TKO ||  || || 21-3
|-
! style=background:white colspan=9 |
|-
|-  bgcolor="#CCFFCC"
| 1980-08-11 || Win ||align=left| Larry Poore || || Ottawa, Ontario, Canada || KO ||  || || 20-3
|-
|-  bgcolor="#CCFFCC"
| 1980-07-17 || Win ||align=left| Emilio Navarez || || Boston, Massachusetts, USA || KO ||  || || 19-3
|-
|-  bgcolor="#CCFFCC"
| 1980-04-19 || Win ||align=left| Ron Thiveridge || || Ottawa, Ontario, Canada || KO ||  || || 18-3
|-
|-  bgcolor="#CCFFCC"
| 1980-03-? || Win ||align=left| Jeff White || || Detroit, Michigan, USA || KO ||  || || 17-3
|-
|-  bgcolor="#FFBBBB"
| 1979-11-? || Loss ||align=left| Ralph Hollet || || Halifax, Nova Scotia, Canada || Decision (Split) || || || 16-3
|-
|-  bgcolor="#CCFFCC"
| 1979-11-? || Win ||align=left| Doug Ware || || Boston, Massachusetts, USA || KO || 1 || || 16-2
|-
|-  bgcolor="#CCFFCC"
| 1979-10-19 || Win ||align=left| Doug Ware || || Ottawa, Ontario, Canada || KO || 1 || || 15-2
|-
|-  bgcolor="#CCFFCC"
| 1979-07-? || Win ||align=left| Ace Lewis || || Boston, Massachusetts, USA || KO || || || 14-2
|-
|-  bgcolor="#CCFFCC"
| 1979-06-09 || Win ||align=left| Emilio Navarez || || Kitchener, Ontario, Canada || KO || 7 || || 13-2
|-
|-  bgcolor="#FFBBBB"
| 1979-05-02 || Loss ||align=left| Blinky Rodriguez || || Lake Tahoe, Nevada, USA || KO (Left Hook) || 1 || || 12-2
|-
|-  bgcolor="#CCFFCC"
| 1979-04-? || Win ||align=left| Kerry Roop || || Ottawa, Ontario, Canada || KO || || || 12-1
|-
|-  bgcolor="#CCFFCC"
| 1978-11-07 || Win ||align=left| Ralph Hollett || || Ottawa, Ontario, Canada || KO || || || 11-1
|-
|-  bgcolor="#CCFFCC"
| 1978-10-? || Win ||align=left| Kerry Roop || || Windsor, Ontario, Canada || Decision (Unanimous) || ||  || 10-1
|-
|-  bgcolor="#CCFFCC"
| 1978-05-? || Win ||align=left| Robby Warchief|| || Sorel-Tracy, Quebec, Canada || Corner Stoppage || 4 || || 9-1
|-
|-  bgcolor="#CCFFCC"
| 1978-03-? || Win ||align=left| Fritz Matthiews || || Kitchener, Ontario, Canada || TKO || || || 8-1
|-
|-  bgcolor="#CCFFCC"
| 1978-03-? || Win ||align=left| Mike Chapman || || Ottawa, Ontario, Canada || KO || || || 7-1
|-
|-  bgcolor="#CCFFCC"
| 1977-11-? || Win ||align=left| Victor Hale || || Rochester, New York, USA || TKO || || || 6-1
|-
|-  bgcolor="#CCFFCC"
| 1977-10-? || Win ||align=left| Carl Beamon || || Buffalo, New York, USA || Decision (Unanimous) || || || 5-1
|-
|-  bgcolor="#CCFFCC"
| 1977-10-? || Win ||align=left| Mark Kosicki || || Ottawa, Ontario, Canada || KO || || || 4-1
|-
|-  bgcolor="#CCFFCC"
| 1977-09-? || Win ||align=left| Roger Hurd || || Toronto, Ontario, Canada || TKO || || || 3-1
|-
|-  bgcolor="#CCFFCC"
| 1977-08-? || Win ||align=left| James Louth || || Rochester, New York, USA || TKO || || || 2-1
|-
|-  bgcolor="#FFBBBB"
| 1977-04-? || Loss ||align=left| Murray Sutherland || || Ottawa, Ontario, Canada || TKO || || || 1-1
|-
|-  bgcolor="#CCFFCC"
| 1976-06-? || Win ||align=left| Serge Simard || || Ottawa, Ontario, Canada || TKO || 1 || || 1-0
|-
|-
| colspan=9 | Legend:

Publications 
Jean-Yves Thériault with coauthor Joseph Jennings wrote a 214-page book called Full-contact Karate, published by Contemporary Books in 1983.

 Full-contact Karate (Google Books)

Further reading

Notes

References 
 
 
 
 
 
 
 
 
 

Canadian male kickboxers
Middleweight kickboxers
Canadian jujutsuka
Sportspeople from New Brunswick
Living people
Year of birth missing (living people)